Noel Leary (born 3 September 1949) is a former Australian rules footballer who played for Melbourne in the Victorian Football League (VFL) during the early 1970s.

Leary, originally from Ulverstone, failed to make much of an impact at Melbourne, despite winning the reserves' best and fairest award in 1973. He did however became a prominent player in the Tasmanian Football League, firstly at Sandy Bay and then at Clarence. He captain-coached Clarence to premierships in 1979 and 1981.

He was one of the inaugural inductees into the Tasmanian Football Hall of Fame when it was launched in 2005.

References

Holmesby, Russell and Main, Jim (2007). The Encyclopedia of AFL Footballers. 7th ed. Melbourne: Bas Publishing.

1949 births
Living people
Melbourne Football Club players
Clarence Football Club players
Sandy Bay Football Club players
Ulverstone Football Club players
Clarence Football Club coaches
Australian rules footballers from Tasmania
Tasmanian Football Hall of Fame inductees